Tim Cook (born 1960) is the CEO of Apple Inc.

Tim Cook or Timothy Cook may also refer to:
Tim Cook (footballer) (born 1974), former Australian Football League player
Tim Cook (historian) (born 1971), Canadian military historian and author
Tim Cook, 2016 Republican Party presidential candidate in several states
Timothy E. Cook (1954–2006), American scholar of mass communications